Dodi Island is an island in Ghana, located  off the shore of Lake Volta. It is a tourist destination and a land place for the cruise ship, Dodi Princess.

Gallery

See also 
 Dodi Princess

References

Islands of Ghana
Volta River Authority
Lake islands of Africa
Artificial islands of Africa